Groundtastic is a quarterly magazine published in the United Kingdom about football grounds.

History
The magazine was first published in March 1995 by Paul Claydon, Vince Taylor and Jon Weaver. Although largely focussed on football grounds in the United Kingdom, it also features stadiums from around the world. Its articles cover the construction and renovation of grounds, as well as detailing football ground histories. The magazine has an annual award for best new non-League ground of the year.

The magazine was featured as a guest publication on Have I Got News for You, and has been described by poet and playwright Ian McMillan as "the greatest magazine in the world."

References

External links
Official website

1995 establishments in the United Kingdom
Association football magazines
Football mass media in the United Kingdom
Magazines established in 1995
Mass media in Essex
Quarterly magazines published in the United Kingdom
Sports magazines published in the United Kingdom